The 1985 Can Am season was the eighteenth and penultimate running of the Sports Car Club of America's prototype series and the ninth running of the revived series. For the first time in series history, no major drivers would compete in the series. The dominant manufacturers were Chevrolet, BMW, and Hart. The dominant chassis were Frissbee-Lola, March, Lola, Frissbee, Osella, and Ralt. Rick Miaskiewicz was declared champion, with 81 points and three wins.

Lou Sell won the two liter class in his March BMW. This would also mark the final year of the two liter class.

Results

References

Can-Am seasons
1985 in American motorsport
1985 in Canadian motorsport